County routes in Yates County, New York, are signed with the Manual on Uniform Traffic Control Devices-standard yellow-on-blue pentagon route marker. Route numbers are also posted at junctions on street blade signs that display the standard route marker for a given route inside a yellow square. Even numbered highways run from east to west and are assigned sequentially starting from the northern county line, while odd numbered highways run from north to south and are assigned sequentially starting from the eastern county line at Seneca Lake.

List of routes

See also

County routes in New York
List of former state routes in New York (201–300)

References